Rowan's Battle of Britain, sometimes mislabeled as Battle of Britain, is a World War II era combat flight simulation game set during the Battle of Britain in 1940.

Gameplay 

Release 
It has been remade twice, first in 2005 as Battle of Britain II: Wings of Victory by Shockwave Productions, Inc., and again in 2007 as Air Battles: Sky Defender by Wild Hare Entertainment, a modified version of the above game with a more arcade-style gameplay. Both versions exist alongside each other.

Reception 

The game received "generally favourable reviews" according to the review aggregation website Metacritic. Samuel Bass of NextGen said of the game, "Detailed, beautiful, and polished to the nth degree, this is the WWII sim we've all been wating for."

Legacy 
On end-of-support of the game, the source code of the game was released by Rowan Software under the "Empire Interactive License" in 2001. Following the source code release a group from the game's community took up the support and produced several unofficial patches until 2005.

References

External links
Official Website (archived)
Mirror of the source code at remaininplay.com

2000 video games
Britain
Combat flight simulators
Commercial video games with freely available source code
Video games developed in the United Kingdom
Windows games
Windows-only games
Britain
Empire Interactive games
Multiplayer and single-player video games
Rowan Software games